The Academy of Management is a professional association for scholars of management and organizations that was established in 1936. It publishes several academic journals, organizes conferences, and provides others forums for management professors and managers to communicate research and ideas.

From 1994 to 2016, the academy was headquartered on the Briarcliff Manor, New York campus of Pace University. Since then it has been based off-campus in independent space in Briarcliff Manor.

Divisions and interest groups
As of August 2018, there were 25 divisions and interest groups that reflect members interests and disciplinary backgrounds.

Divisions offer a range of member services, including educational sessions, social events at the academys annual meeting, professional development opportunities like paper development workshops, newsletters, and professional service opportunities.

Publications
The academy publishes the following academic journals:

 Academy of Management Journal
 Academy of Management Review
 Academy of Management Perspectives (formerly Academy of Management Executive)
 Academy of Management Learning and Education
 Academy of Management Annals
 Academy of Management Discoveries
 Academy of Management Insights

The first three journals were ranked in the top 40 business journals in the world in 2006 by the Financial Times.

Southern Management Association
The Southern Management Association (SMA) is a regional affiliate of the Academy of Management and, along with SAGE, publishes the Journal of Management. It is an academic association with a stated primary purpose to advance the teaching, learning, research, and practice of management. As of 2017, membership was over 1000 professors of management, doctoral students, and business executives.

As an academic association, SMA has deemed the development and dissemination of new ideas and approaches in the science of management as a critical objective. The annual meeting hosts consortia for doctoral students, professional development workshops, paper presentations, symposia, and other sessions of attendee interest.

See also
Human resources development
Human resource management
Industrial and organizational psychology
Industrial sociology

References

External links

Management science
Human resource management publications
Professional associations based in the United States
Organizations established in 1936
Briarcliff Manor, New York